Saint-Martin-du-Bec is a commune in the Seine-Maritime department in the Normandy region in northern France.

Geography

Heraldry

Population

Places of interest
 The church of St. Martin, dating from the twelfth century.
 The castle of Bec-Crespin, with a thirteenth-century gate and portcullis.
 Old buildings, parkland and lakes of the castle grounds.

See also
Communes of the Seine-Maritime department

References

Communes of Seine-Maritime